Niggerhead is a former name for several things thought to resemble the head of a black person. 

Niggerhead may also refer to:

Plants formerly known as niggerhead
Carex secta, a New Zealand sedge 
Echinocactus polycephalus, a North American cactus
Enneapogon nigricans, an Australian grass
Rudbeckia hirta, a flowering plant in the family Asteraceae

Other uses
 Nigger Head, an island in North Queensland, Australia
 Nigger Head Road, a place in North Carolina, U.S., with similar displays in other Southern towns
 Tawhai Hill, a hill in New Zealand, formerly known as Niggerhead

See also
Nigger (disambiguation)
Use of nigger in proper names